The discography of South Korean vocal group SG Wannabe consists of nine studio albums, five compilation albums, eight video albums, two extended plays, and numerous singles and soundtrack appearances.

SG Wannabe debuted in 2004 with the album SG Wanna Be+, which peaked at #4 on the monthly Recording Industry Association of Korea album sales chart and sold over 200,000 copies. The group's second album, Saldaga, reached #1 on the chart and was the best-selling album of 2005 in South Korea, selling over 400,000 copies, despite a slump in the domestic music market. 

The group's third album, The 3rd Masterpiece (2006), and fourth album, The Sentimental Chord (2007), were also #1 albums, with the later becoming the best-selling album of 2007 in South Korea, selling over 190,000 copies.

Albums

Studio albums

Compilation albums

Reissues

Video albums

Extended plays

Single albums

Singles

Soundtrack appearances

Videography

Music videos

Notes

References

External links
Discography at Melon

Discographies of South Korean artists
K-pop music group discographies
Rhythm and blues discographies